Wrocław Główny is the largest and most important passenger train station in the city of Wrocław, in southwestern Poland. Situated at the junction of several important routes, it is the largest railway station in the Lower Silesia Voivodeship, as well as in Poland in terms of the number of passengers serviced.

In 2018, the station served over 21,200,000 passengers.

Structure 

The main gate is located north of the station, on Piłsudski street, with two additional entrances located at either end of the main hall. The back gate is located on the far side of the tracks, in the south facing Sucha street. The station has six parallel platforms (platforms I through IV with two tracks, platform V with one track and one short one, platform VI with one track). Each has two subway exits, which lead to the main hall. Since all platforms and tracks are above the street level, the tunnels are located at the same level as outside pavements.

History 

The station was built in 1855–1857, as the starting point of the Oberschlesische Eisenbahn (Upper Silesian Railway), as well as the line from Breslau to Glogau via Posen. It replaced the earlier complex of the Oberschlesischer Bahnhof (Upper Silesian Railway Station, built  1841–1842). Its designer was the royal Prussian architect Wilhelm Grapow, and in the mid-19th century, it was located near the southern outskirts of the city, as the areas to the south had not yet been urbanized.

The original concourse was located where the passenger hall now is and was adjacent to the station yard. When construction finished in the mid-19th century, the station only had one platform, but the platform hall was some 200 meters long, and it was regarded as one of the biggest structures of this kind in Europe. By the entrances were luggage lockers, telephone, and telegraph facilities. In the station complex were a restaurant and three waiting rooms (1st, 2nd, and 3rd class). There was also a special room and a separate hallway for VIPs.

In the late 19th century, when the government of the German Empire heavily invested in railway construction, the station was extended. Prices of real estate around the station grew, as the city began to develop southwards. In 1899, the construction of five new platforms began, four of them covered by a large roof. The number of passenger platforms within the station grew to 13 and all were elevated. The façade of the main hall was remodeled in 1899–1904.

During World War II, Polish resistance from the group Zagra-Lin successfully attacked a Nazi troop transport on the station on 23 April 1943. A commemorative plate honoring their actions was placed after Nazi Germany was defeated and Breslau, together with Silesia, was incorporated into Poland, its German population expelled.  After the war, Breslau Central (Breslau Hauptbahnhof) was renamed Wroclaw Central (Wrocław Główny).

On 8 January 1967, the popular Polish actor Zbigniew Cybulski died on platform 3. Cybulski was trying to jump into a train that was already departing, but fell instead under its wheels. On the 30th anniversary of this event, Andrzej Wajda unveiled a plaque on the platform in memory of Cybulski.

In 2010–2012 the station was extensively refurbished for the Euro 2012 championships.

Train services
Train services are operated by PKP Intercity, Polregio and Koleje Dolnośląskie.

Until mid-December 2014 the station was also served by EuroCity "Wawel", which used to run once daily between Berlin Hauptbahnhof and Wrocław Główny, formerly even further to Kraków Główny. The service has been re-established since 2020, now extending further East to Przemyśl near the Ukrainian border.

Long Distance International

  ÖBB Nightjet Berlin-Charlottenburg – Berlin Hbf –  Frankfurt (Oder) – Wrocław – Ostrava – Vienna (One train pair daily)
 EN Berlin Hbf – Wroclaw Glowny – Budapest-Keleti
 LEO Praha hl. n. – Pardubice – Wrocław  – Friday, Saturday, Sunday
EuroCity services (EC) (EC 95 by DB) (IC by PKP) Berlin - Frankfurt (Oder) - Rzepin - Wrocław – Katowice – Kraków – Rzeszów – Przemyśl

Domestic Passenger Services

The station is served by the following service(s):

Express Intercity Premium services (EIP) Warsaw - Wrocław
Express Intercity services (EIC) Warsaw - Wrocław 
Intercity services (IC) Wrocław- Opole - Częstochowa - Warszawa
 Intercity services (IC) Wrocław - Ostrów Wielkopolski - Łódź - Warszawa
 Intercity services (IC) Zgorzelec - Legnica - Wrocław - Ostrów Wielkopolski - Łódź - Warszawa
Intercity services (IC) Białystok - Warszawa - Częstochowa - Opole - Wrocław
Intercity services (IC) Białystok - Warszawa - Łódź - Ostrów Wielkopolski - Wrocław
Intercity services (IC) Ełk - Białystok - Warszawa - Łódź - Ostrów Wielkopolski - Wrocław
Intercity services (IC) Zielona Góra - Wrocław - Opele - Częstochowa - Kraków - Rzeszów - Przemyśl
Intercity services (IC) Swinoujscie - Szczecin - Kostrzyn - Rzepin - Zielona Gora - Wroclaw - Katowice - Kraków
Intercity services (IC) Ustka - Koszalin - Poznań - Wrocław - Opole - Bielsko-Biała
Intercity services (IC) Bydgoszcz - Poznań - Leszno - Wrocław - Opole - Rybnik - Bielsko-Biała - Zakopane
Intercity services (TLK) Lublin Główny — Świnoujście
Regional services (PR) Wrocław - Głogów - Zielona Góra Główna 
Regional services (PR) Wrocław Główny - Leszno - Poznań Główny 
Regional services (PR) Wrocław Główny - Strzelin - Ziębice
Regional services (PR) Wrocław Główny - Jelenia Góra - Szklarska Poręba Górna
Regional services (PR) Wrocław - Oleśnica - Ostrów Wielkopolski
Regional services (PR) Wrocław Główny - Oleśnica - Kluczbork
Regional service (PR) Wrocław - Oleśnica - Kluczbork - Lubliniec 
Regional services (PR) Wrocław Główny - Oława - Brzeg
Regional services (PR) Wrocław Główny - Oława - Brzeg - Nysa
Regional service (PR) Wrocław - Oława - Brzeg - Nysa - Kędzierzyn-Koźle
Regional services (PR) Wrocław Główny - Oława - Brzeg - Opole Główne
Regional service (PR) Wrocław - Oława - Brzeg - Opole Główne - Kędzierzyn-Koźle
Regional service (PR) Wrocław - Oława - Brzeg - Opole Główne - Kędzierzyn-Koźle - Racibórz
Regional service (PR) Wrocław - Oława - Brzeg - Opole Główne - Gliwice
Regional services (PR) Wrocław Główny - Jelcz-Laskowice

Railway lines stemming from or ending at the station 
 Railway line 132 Bytom–Wrocław Główny
 Railway line 271 Wrocław Główny–Poznań Główny
 Railway line 273 Wrocław Główny–Szczecin Główny
 Railway line 276 Wrocław Główny–Międzylesie
 Railway line 285 Wrocław Główny–Jedlina-Zdrój

Gallery

See also
Rail transport in Poland
List of busiest railway stations in Poland

References

External links 
 
 Transport in Wroclaw

Railway stations in Poland opened in 1857
Główny
Railway stations served by Przewozy Regionalne InterRegio
Transport infrastructure completed in 1904
Art Nouveau railway stations
Główny
1857 establishments in Prussia